Opostegoides malaysiensis is a moth of the family Opostegidae. It was described by Donald R. Davis in 1989. It is known from western Malaysia.

The length of forewings is about 2.7 mm. Adults have been recorded in late August. There is one generation per year.

Etymology
The species name is derived from the country of origin (Malaysia) plus the Latin suffix ensis (denoting place, locality).

References

Opostegidae
Moths described in 1989